Smestad is a village in the municipality of Rælingen, Norway. Its population (2005) is 578.

References

Villages in Akershus